California's 20th congressional district is a congressional district in the U.S. state of California. Serving much of southern and southeastern part of the state's Central Valley, the district is currently represented by Republican Kevin McCarthy, the current House Speaker.

Redistricting in 2022 returned the district to the San Joaquin Valley. The new 20th district includes parts of Kern, Tulare, Kings, and Fresno counties. It includes the southern Sierra Nevada and western Mojave Desert, with three "fingers" extending west into the valley. Cities in the district include Clovis, Tehachapi, Ridgecrest, Taft, Lemoore, the west and northeast sides of Bakersfield, the south side of Visalia, the northeast side of Tulare, the north side of Hanford, and a sliver of northeastern Fresno including California State University, Fresno. The new 20th district is the most Republican-leaning district in California, according to the 2022 Cook Partisan Voting Index.

Prior to 2022, it encompassed much of the Central Coast region. The district included Monterey and San Benito counties, most of Santa Cruz County, and portions of Santa Clara County.

Prior to redistricting in 2011, the 20th district was located in the San Joaquin Valley. It covered Kings County and portions of Fresno and Kern counties, including most of the city of Fresno. That area is now largely divided between the 21st and 16th districts, while most of the current 20th was within the former 17th.

Recent election results in statewide races

List of members representing the district

Election results

1932

1934

1936

1938

1940

1942

1944

1946

1948

1950

1952

1954

1956

1958

1960

1962

1964

1966

1968

1970

1972

1974

1976

1978

1980

1982

1984

1986

1988

1990

1992

1994

1996

1998

2000

2002

2004

2006

2008

2010

2012

2014

2016

2018

2020

2022

Historical district boundaries

See also
List of United States congressional districts

References

External links

 Rep. Kevin McCarthy’s official House of Representatives website
 GovTrack.us: California's 20th congressional district
 RAND California Election Returns: District Definitions
 California Voter Foundation map – CD20

20
Government of Monterey County, California
Government of Santa Cruz County, California
Aptos, California
Carmel-by-the-Sea, California
Gilroy, California
Monterey, California
Pacific Grove, California
Salinas, California
Salinas Valley
Santa Cruz, California
Santa Lucia Range
Watsonville, California
Constituencies established in 1933
1933 establishments in California
Los Padres National Forest